Kwong Ki-chi, GBS is a Hong Kong government official. He was the Deputy Secretary for the Treasury, Secretary for the Treasury and Secretary for Information Technology & Broadcasting. He later served as the chief executive of Hong Kong Exchanges and Clearing. and he authored a report on the Chinese Enterprises' rise to global eminence

References

Government officials of Hong Kong
Living people
Hong Kong chief executives
Recipients of the Gold Bauhinia Star
Year of birth missing (living people)
Place of birth missing (living people)